Andriy Anatoliyovych Anishchenko (born 16 April 1975) is a Ukrainian football coach and a former player.

Honours
FC Kryvbas Kryvyi Rih
Ukrainian Premier League bronze: 1998–99, 1999–2000

External links
 

1975 births
Footballers from Kharkiv
Living people
FC Olympik Kharkiv players
Ukrainian footballers
FC Krystal Kherson players
PFC Krylia Sovetov Samara players
Russian Premier League players
Ukrainian expatriate footballers
Expatriate footballers in Russia
FC Metalist Kharkiv players
FC Kryvbas Kryvyi Rih players
Ukrainian Premier League players
FC Arsenal Kharkiv players
FC Helios Kharkiv players
Ukrainian football managers
Association football defenders